BarAS is the local season of the reality The Bar in Lithuania. The show was aired from 2003 to 2005 with 3 seasons in total. LNK is the channel was aired.

Season 1
Start Date: 7 June 2003
End Date: 31 August 2003
Duration: 85 days
Contestants:
The Finalists: Laimis (The Winner) & Jurgita (Runner-up).
Evicted Contestants: Apolonas, Aušra, Donatas, Ieva, Ilma, Jolita, Kęstas, Lauryna, Robertas & Rolandas.
Other Contestants (exit type unknown): Agnieszka, Dainius, Darius & Kristina.

Contestants

Season 2
Start Date: 11 October 2004
End Date: 31 December 2004
Duration: 82 days
Contestants:
The Finalists: Andrius (The winner) & Skaistė (Runner-up).
Evicted Contestants: Daiva, Darius, Eglė, Gabija, Ieva, Lina, Mikas, Mindaugas, Pripsas, Rolandas, Skaiva, Stella, Vilija & Vytas.

Contestants

Season 3 (All-Stars)
Start Date: 16 April 2005
End Date: 27 May 2005
Duration: 42 days.
The Prize: 100,000 litas
Contestants:
The Finalists: Skaistė (The winner) & Dainius (Runner-up).
Evicted Contestants: Agnieška, Andrius, Arnoldas, Daiva, Gintas, Ieva, Laimis, Linutė, Mindaugas, Ona & Rolandas.

Contestants

Nominations

References

2003 Lithuanian television series debuts
2005 Lithuanian television series endings
Lithuanian television shows
2000s Lithuanian television series
LNK (television station) original programming